This is a list of hospitals in San Diego, California.

References

California, San Diego

Hospitals
Hospitals, San Diego
San Diego